The Actas Españolas de Psiquiatría is a bimonthly peer-reviewed medical journal covering psychiatry. It was established in 1940 and is published by the Fundación Juan José López-Ibor. The editor-in-chief is Juan José López-Ibor Aliño (Complutense University of Madrid).

History 
The journal was established in 1940, by Juan José López Ibor but changed its name to Actas Españolas de Psiquiatría y Neurología the following year. The journal was renamed Actas Luso-Españolas de Psiquiatría y Neurología in 1944 and published in Lisbon. In the 1970s, y ciencias afines ("and related sciences") was added to the title. The journal regained its original name in 1998.

Abstracting and indexing 
The journal is abstracted and indexed in:
 Index Medicus/MEDLINE/PubMed
 Science Citation Index Expanded
 Scopus
According to the Journal Citation Reports, the journal has a 2014 impact factor of 1.2.

References

External links 
 

Multilingual journals
Psychiatry journals
Bimonthly journals
Publications established in 1940